David Levis Edmund Andrea Arnott (15 January 1899 – 18 September 1960) was an Australian politician.

He was born in Portland to farmer John Arnott and Theresa Valentine Pedrazzi. He attended state schools and became a farmer at Tyrendarra. On 21 May 1924 he married Amy Stanford, with whom he had four children. He was president and secretary of the local Pastoral and Agricultural Society and a member of the Victorian Dairyfarmers Association. In 1952 he was elected to the Victorian Legislative Council as a Labor Party member for Western Province. He served until his defeat in 1958, and he died at Tyrendarra two years later.

References

1899 births
1960 deaths
20th-century Australian politicians
Australian Labor Party members of the Parliament of Victoria
Members of the Victorian Legislative Council